Squalius keadicus is a species of fresh-water fish in the family Cyprinidae. It is found only in Greece, and known as the menida in Greek.

It is endemic to the Evrotas River in the Peloponnese. It is threatened by habitat loss.

References

 

Squalius
Fish described in 1971
Taxonomy articles created by Polbot
Taxa named by Alexander I. Stephanidis